The Orion class is a series of 8 container ships built for Zodiac Maritime. The first 4 ships are operated by Mediterranean Shipping Company (MSC) and the remaining ships are operated by Ocean Network Express (ONE). The ships were built by Hyundai Heavy Industries in South Korea. The ships have a maximum theoretical capacity of 14,952 twenty-foot equivalent units (TEU).

List of ships

References 

Container ship classes
Ships built by Hyundai Heavy Industries Group